Honor Bound (also known as Red End) is a 1988 film directed by Jeannot Szwarc.

Cast 
 John Philbin as Sgt. Max Young
 Tom Skerritt as Col. Sam Cahill
 George Dzundza as Sergeant Major Wocjinski
 Relja Bašić as General Gorodnikov
 Janez Vajavec as Colonel Ilyushin
 Michael Hofland as Gunther Stahl
 Zdenko Jelčić as Gurkov
 Richard D. Sharp as Sgt. Ray Tanner
 Gene Davis as Sgt. Chester Wind River
 Gabrielle Lazur as Erika Tyler
 Angus MacInnes as Jessup
 Burnell Tucker as Steele
 Lawrence Pressman as General Maxwell

Production
The movie was filmed in Berlin, Germany, and Yugoslavia.

References

External links
 

1988 films
American thriller films
Films directed by Jeannot Szwarc
1988 thriller films
Jadran Film films
Films shot in Berlin
Films shot in Germany
Cold War films
1980s English-language films
1980s American films